Graham Alexander is the debut album by the American singer-songwriter Graham Alexander, self-released on December 28, 2011. It was released in Japan on ThisTime Records in 2013. Recording sessions for the album took place at several locations from 2009 to 2011. The album's production was credited to songwriter Graham Alexander, Fran Smith Jr., and Andy Kravitz. Spotify's top 100 songs chosen by fans playlist included the first single from the album "Biggest Fan" at No. 6 in its 2011 list.

Background
Before joining the Broadway show, Rain, Alexander built a following with his band, The Roadrunners and developed a following in the New York City and Philadelphia areas. Members of the Philadelphia rock band, The Hooters, joined in the recording sessions. Andy Kravitz, a Grammy award-winning producer, were enlisted to drum as well as produce. Arthur Barrow, a member of Frank Zappa's band added bass to "Hang Around". The record was mastered at Sterling Sound in NYC.

Track listing 

2013 Japan Release bonus tracks
 "Time To Let It Go" – 3:40
 "Cursed with the Faith of a Child" – 3:31
 "You've Got To Make Up Your Mind" – 2:42
 "Baby Let Me Follow You Down" (Traditional arr. Alexander) – 3:41

Spotify bonus tracks
 "Remembering Talking All Night" – 2:06
 "You've Got To Make Up Your Mind" – 2:42
 "Long Way Home" – 3:40

Personnel
 Graham Alexander – electric guitar (all songs except 5, 7), acoustic guitar (1, 4, 5, 6, 7, 9), piano (2, 3, 4, 9, 10) bass (all songs except 2 and 9), organ (1), guitar solo (4), trumpet (3, 4), clarinet (4), mandolin (5), keyboards (4, 6), percussion (all songs except 3, 8, 9)
 Zach Harski –  guitar solo (1), electric guitar (all songs except 5, 7, 9), acoustic guitar (3, 7, 9), saxophone (3, 4, 8), mandolin (5), backing vocals (6, 8, 10), percussion (6, 10), 
 Fran Smith Jr. – bass (2), backing vocal (4)
 Eric Bazilian – guitar (9), hurdy gurdy (7)
 Rob Hyman – piano solo (3)
 Ally Jenkins – violin – (9)
 Kaitlyn Raitz – cello – (9)
 Andy Kravitz – drums (all songs except 7), percussion (7), engineer
 Teresa McCann – backing vocals (2, 8, 9, 10 ), piano (7), keyboards (7, 8)
 Adam Belling – percussion (1, 5, 6)
 John Forster – percussion (1, 5, 10)
 Colin Newell – trombone, trumpet (3)
 Arthur Barrow – bass (8), clavinet (8)
 Dr. Dave Appleby – electric guitar (8)
 String and Horn arrangements – Graham Alexander and Zach Harski
 Ryan Moys – engineer (4, 9)
 Tom Coyne – mastering
 Plink Giglio – mastering, engineer (4)

References

2011 debut albums
Graham Alexander (musician) albums